Charles Raymond Perrault is an artificial intelligence researcher and a Distinguished Computer Scientist at SRI International. He was a co-principal investigator of the CALO project, which is the predecessor for several AI technologies including Siri.

Education
Perrault received a bachelor of science in mathematics from McGill University and a Ph.D. in computer and communication sciences from the University of Michigan in 1975.

Career
Perrault was a faculty member of the University of Toronto from 1974 to 1983, rising from assistant to full professor.

He started at SRI International in 1983, and was the director of the Artificial Intelligence Center from 1987 to 2017. While at SRI, he was a co-principal investigator of the CALO project and is also a founder of the Center for the Study of Language and Information.

Memberships and awards
Perrault was the co-editor in chief of the journal Artificial Intelligence from 2001 to 2010, the president and a trustee of the International Joint Conferences on Artificial Intelligence from 1992 to 2001, and was president of the Association for Computational Linguistics in 1983.

In 1990, Perrault was named a founding fellow of the American Association for Artificial Intelligence and in 2018 of American Association for Advancement of Science In July 2011, he won the Donald E. Walker Distinguished Service Award from the International Joint Conferences on Artificial Intelligence.

References

External links
 Raymond Perrault on LinkedIn

Living people
Year of birth missing (living people)
Place of birth missing (living people)
Artificial intelligence researchers
SRI International people
Fellows of the Association for the Advancement of Artificial Intelligence
Academic staff of the University of Toronto
McGill University Faculty of Science alumni
University of Michigan alumni